Funmi Fadoju (born 15 August 2002) is an English netball player, who has represented the national team since 2022. At club level, Fadoju plays for London Pulse in the Netball Superleague.

Early life
Fadoju is from Dagenham, London. She attended Eastbury Community School, and won a schools cross-country competition in 2017.

Club career
She made her Netball Superleague debut for London Pulse in March 2020; she came on in the third quarter of Pulse's opening match of the season. She won the Netball Superleague Young Player of the Season award in both 2021 and 2022 seasons.

International career
Fadoju represented England under-21s at the 2019 Netball Europe Under-21 Championships. She was aged 16 at the time.

Fadoju received her first senior callup for the 2021 Vitality Roses Reunited Series, and made her debut for the senior team in their 2022 series against Uganda. She was not selected for the 2022 Commonwealth Games. She played for England in their tour of Australia. In the final game of the series, she was the player of the match with 17 deflections. In December 2022, Netball Scoop named Fadoju joint sixth in their list of world's best players.

References

External links
 Netball Superleague Profile

2002 births
Living people
English netball players
London Pulse players
Black British sportswomen
Netball Superleague players